Jordan has been a very close major non-NATO ally of the United States in the Middle East since 1996.

History

Relations between the U.S. and Jordan have been close for over four decades. U.S. policy seeks to reinforce Jordan's commitment to peace, stability, and moderation. The peace process and Jordan's opposition to terrorism parallel and indirectly assist wider U.S. interests. Accordingly, through economic and military assistance and through close political cooperation, the United States has helped Jordan maintain its stability and prosperity.

Since its inception, Jordan has relied on sponsorship from major Western powers. Great Britain filled this role until the late 1940s; the U.S. stepped in during the 1950s. During the Gulf War of 1991, Jordan tried to solve the situation in an Arabian framework that the U.S. interpreted as pro-Iraq. As a result, the U.S. started monitoring the country's only ocean port, Aqaba, to prevent any supplies from reaching Iraq. Jordan suffered financial hardships for this, and attitudes toward the U.S. only improved during the Madrid Conference of 1991, where the U.S. deemed Jordanian participation as essential.

King Abdullah advised Washington against the 2003 Iraq War, but later allegedly gave the invading coalition some degree of covert and tacit support, despite the overwhelming opinion of his public. The Jordanian government publicly opposed the war against Iraq. The King stressed to the United States and European Union that a diplomatic solution, in accordance with UN Security Council (UNSC) resolutions 1284 (1999) and 1409 (2002), was the only appropriate model for resolving the conflict between Iraq and the UN. In August 2002 he told The Washington Post that an attempt to invade Iraq would be a "tremendous mistake" and that it could "throw the whole area into turmoil".

In February 2023, King Adbullah and Crown Prince Hussein met with U.S. President Biden at the White House in Washington, D.C. The President reaffirmed that the US would support Jordan’s "security and economic prosperity". It was Abdullah's third meeting with President Biden after July 2021 and July 2022.

Programs

Since 1952, the United States has provided Jordan with economic assistance totaling more than $14 billion ($1.3 billion in loans, and $7.7 billion in grants), including funds for development projects, health care, education, construction to increase water availability, support for microeconomic policy shifts toward a more completely free market system, and both grant and loan acquisition of U.S. agriculture commodities. These programs have been successful and have contributed to Jordanian stability while strengthening the bilateral relationship. U.S. military assistance—provision of material and training—is designed to meet Jordan's legitimate defense needs, including preservation of border integrity and regional stability. Jordan signed a Threshold Agreement with the Millennium Challenge Corporation (MCC) in October 2006, and was subsequently deemed by the MCC to be eligible for a Compact Agreement in recognition of the country's progress on economic, social, and political reform indicators.

As of 2013, the United States had given Jordan's intelligence agency, the General Intelligence Directorate (the G.I.D), over $3.3 billion in aid over the previous five years, with another $200 million pledged for the Syrian refugee crisis. The G.I.D is a close partner of the American Central Intelligence Agency (CIA). In 2014, due to concerns over Jordan's fragile economy being stretched by the influx of Syrian refugees, President Obama announced he would seek $1 billion in loan guarantees in addition to the $1.25 billion Congress approved in 2013.

Human Rights promotion

Since the deadly terrorist attacks of 9/11, the United States has focused on security and stability in the region, while simultaneously fighting the War on Terror. As military training and intelligence operations became a higher priority after 2001, the Bush Administration revised the nation's rhetoric on human rights promotion and democracy in the region, despite the turbulent political climate of the Middle East. In an effort to move toward a more interventionist foreign policy, Bush created a specific freedom agenda. He strongly encouraged "the spread of freedom as the great alternative to the terrorists' ideology of hatred." Based on American ideals of democracy and liberty, the agenda emphasized the way the continued spread of freedoms can combat the conditions and opposition that breed extremism. The United States' strong push for action and democratic reform, especially from 2001 to 2008, resulted in the refinement of technical programs and an increase in democracy assistance. Issues of gender empowerment, legislative reform, emphasis on elections, and support for educational and developmental programs have risen to the forefront. 

Reform/action taken for human rights promotion and democratization in Jordan include:
 2,800 troops deployed for protection of the border 
 New leadership for the Ministry of Interior, Jordanian Armed Forces, and the General Intelligence
 Democracy assistance for programs such as Jordan School Expansion Project, Community Engagement Project, Local Enterprise Support Activity, and Workforce Development Program
 Push to pass proposal for the number of female representatives to grow to 23, one representative for each electoral district

U.S. Embassy

The U.S. embassy is located in Abdoun, Amman. Principal U.S. officials in Jordan include:
 Ambassador Henry T. Wooster
 Deputy Chief of Mission Mike Hankey

Jordan Embassy 
The Jordan embassy is located in Washington, D.C. 

 Ambassador Dina Kawar
 Deputy Chief of Mission Ali Al Arabiyat

Friends of Jordan Caucus

In the United States Congress, the Friends of Jordan Caucus was launched March 6, 2009, to support a strong relationship between Jordan and the United States and to facilitate the exchange of ideas between Members of the House of Representatives and Jordanian officials. The caucus was first co-chaired by Congressmen Schiff and Boustany, and Congressmen Baird (R-IN) and Fortenberry (R-NE) served as the first vice chairs.

See also
 Jordanian American
 Anti-American sentiment in Jordan
 Embassy of Jordan, Washington, D.C.
 List of Jordanian ambassadors to the United States
 United States Ambassador to Jordan
 Foreign relations of the United States
 Foreign relations of Jordan

References

Further reading
 Bunch, Clea. The United States and Jordan: Middle East Diplomacy during the Cold War (London: I. B. Tauris, 2013) 288 pp.
 Markussen, Joakim Aalmen, Strategic Impartiality: Lyndon B. Johnson's Policy toward Jordan 1964–1968, MA Dissertation

External links
Interview with King Hussein about Jordan - U.S. relations from the Dean Peter Krogh Foreign Affairs Digital Archives
History of Jordan - U.S. relations

 Embassy of US - Amman
 Embassy of Jordan - Washington D.C.

 
Bilateral relations of the United States
United States